John Weir Rushmere (born 1 April 1939) is a South African architect and former rugby player and cricketer.

Life and career
Rushmere was born in Port Elizabeth but attended the University of Cape Town, where he studied architecture. While he was a student there he played for the university rugby team and played first-class cricket for the South African Universities cricket team, as well as playing for the Western Province cricket team in the Currie Cup.

A left-arm fast bowler and useful lower-order batsman, Rushmere had his best first-class bowling figures in his first match when he took 6 for 32 in December 1960 to dismiss Western Province for 89 in the first innings and set up the South African Universities' innings victory. He top-scored for Western Province in their Currie Cup match against Eastern Province in January 1963 when he made 49 batting at number five; his older brother Colin was in the Eastern Province side.

After graduating with a Bachelor of Architecture degree, Rushmere moved to Johannesburg and worked for three years with the architecture firm Associated Architects. He played rugby for the Transvaal provincial team, but quit in 1966 in protest against the excessive influence of the Afrikaner Broederbond over Transvaal rugby. He moved to Port Elizabeth in 1967 and played a few seasons of rugby for Eastern Province before retiring in 1970.

Rushmere was one of the founders of the Port Elizabeth architecture firm Erasmus Rushmere Reid in 1967. His works include the Duckpond pavilion at St George's Park Cricket Ground in Port Elizabeth, and Cullen Bowles House at Rhodes University in Grahamstown.  He served as head of Nelson Mandela University's School of Architecture, and was awarded the South African Institute of Architects gold medal in 2001.

References

External links
 

1939 births
Living people
University of Cape Town alumni
South African cricketers
South African rugby union players
Western Province cricketers
South African Universities cricketers
South African architects
Cricketers from Port Elizabeth